Manilla is an unincorporated census-designated place in Walker Township, Rush County, Indiana.

History
Manilla was originally called Wilmington, and under the latter name was laid out in 1836. The name Manilla most likely is derived from Manila, in the Philippines.

The Manilla post office has been in operation since 1840.

Geography

Demographics

References

Census-designated places in Rush County, Indiana
Census-designated places in Indiana